Clyde Peak is an  mountain summit located in Glacier National Park in the U.S. state of Montana. The mountain straddles the border shared by Flathead County and Glacier County. It is situated on the Continental Divide so precipitation runoff from the west side of the mountain drains into Thompson Creek which is part of the Middle Fork Flathead River watershed, and the east side drains into headwaters of Red Eagle Creek, which flows to Red Eagle Lake, thence Saint Mary Lake. It is set in the Lewis Range, and the nearest higher neighbor is Mount Logan 1.44 mile to the northwest.

Etymology 
The mountain's name commemorates Norman Clyde (1885–1972), who made the first ascent of this peak on July 23, 1923. Clyde is credited with 130 first ascents, most of which were in the Sierra Nevada of California. In 1923 he spent 36 days in Glacier National Park, Montana, where he climbed 36 mountains, including 11 first ascents. This geographical feature's name has not yet been officially adopted by the United States Board on Geographic Names.

Geology 

Like other mountains in Glacier National Park, Clyde Peak is composed of sedimentary rock laid down during the Precambrian to Jurassic periods.

Climate 
According to the Köppen climate classification system, Clyde Peak is located in an alpine subarctic climate zone with long, cold, snowy winters, and cool to warm summers. Winter temperatures can drop below −10 °F with wind chill factors below −30 °F. Due to its altitude, it receives precipitation all year, as snow in winter, and as thunderstorms in summer. This climate supports the Red Eagle Glacier remnant on the north slope of the peak.

Gallery

See also

 Mountains and mountain ranges of Glacier National Park (U.S.)
 Norman Clyde Peak

References

External links 
 Weather forecast: National Weather Service
 Clyde Peak photo: Flickr

Mountains of Glacier County, Montana
Mountains of Flathead County, Montana
Mountains of Glacier National Park (U.S.)
Lewis Range
Mountains of Montana
North American 2000 m summits